Miguel Ángel Sánchez López (born 2 July 1980) is a Nicaraguan footballer who played for Matagalpa.

Club career
He has played for Nicaraguan league sides Real Madriz and Diriangén whom he left in summer 2006 to return to Madriz. His contract with Matagalpa was terminated in March 2014.

International career
Sánchez made his debut for Nicaragua in a February 2004 friendly match against Haiti and has earned a total of 7 caps, scoring no goals. He has represented his country in 1 FIFA World Cup qualification match and played at the 2005 UNCAF Nations Cup.

His final international was a February 2005 UNCAF Nations Cup match against Belize.

References

External links

1980 births
Living people
People from Madriz Department
Association football forwards
Nicaraguan men's footballers
Nicaragua international footballers
Real Madriz FC players
Diriangén FC players
2005 UNCAF Nations Cup players